The First Scutari War was an armed conflict in 1405–1412 between Zeta and the Venetian Republic over Scutari and other former possessions of Zeta captured by Venice.

Background 
Before this war Zeta was governed by Đurađ II Balšić. His wife Jelena Balšić was firmly opposed to his pro-Venetian policy and to his sales of Scutari, Drivast, and other towns together with islands on Skadar Lake to the Venetians in 1396. She did not approve Venetian obstruction of contacts between local Eastern Orthodox Christians with the Metropolitanate of Zeta and the Serbian Patriarchate of Peć, and also the fact that Venetians were cutting off Eastern Orthodox monasteries around Skadar Lake from their legally valid income and possessions. In addition to that, an aggressive trading policy of Venetians in the region significantly reduced Zeta′s earnings. She had significant influence on the way her son Balša III governed Zeta after the death of Đurađ II. Even before the First Scutari War she was in dispute with Venetians about the jurisdiction of Zetan Orthodox Metropolitanate over the orthodox churches around the river Bojana and the Church of St. Peter in Scutari. In front of Venetians Balša III, based on Jelena's instructions, protected the ancient rights of the Serbian church and Zetan Metropolitan bishop appointed by the Patriarchate of Peć.

Balša's supporters 
After Đurađ II died in 1403, Balša III took over control of Zeta and with Jelena′s support started an eight years long war against Venice in 1405. Jelena and Balša apparently started the war without much preparations hoping they would soon easily receive international support. They especially counted on support of the  Serbian Despot and Dubrovnik, the supporters of emperor Sigismund who had territorial aspirations in Dalmatia. These hopes were not justified. In January and again in March 1405 they first approached Dubrovnik for help, but were politely rejected.

During this war, Balša was not fully supported by urban population of Bar and Ulcinj whose business interests were somewhat better preserved with good relations with powerful the Venetian Empire. His main supporters were warrior nobility in Zeta, pronoiers in the Scutari region, and Serb and Albanian peasants unsatisfied with taxes. The Đurašević family participated on Balša's side, Koja Zaharia and Dhimiter Jonima supported Venetians, while Dukagjinis were neutral.

Beginning of the war 
The war began in 1405 when Balša took advantage of the rebellion of local population in the region of Scutari and captured all Scutari region (including Drivast) except the Scutari fortress itself. It is uncertain if he inspired the revolt which started in early 1405, but he certainly utilized it. Radič Humoj and many other most distincted local Venetian pronoiers (like Nika Bogoje, Petar Konte, Nikola Lumbardini, Andrija Sklavo, and Nikola Sigeci) deserted Venice and supported Balša III in order to save their position and property. Balša was intolerant of local nobles who would not support him and many of those who would dare to desert him were captured and crippled, i.e. deprived of a limb and nose.

Venetians in return captured the three most important ports of Zeta: Bar, Ulcinj, and Budva. They also offered 500 ducats for the person who would kill Jelena Balšić and her son Balša III. The reward was later increased to 2,000 ducats. Balša found himself in a difficult situation because the Ottoman Empire (a possible ally against Venice) was weakened after the Battle of Ankara in 1402, and his ally the Serbian Despot was involved in the Ottoman civil war. To make things even worse, Sandalj Hranić intended to capture the whole Gulf of Kotor. In such circumstances Balša decided to accept Ottoman suzerainty, which included a regular tribute payment to the sultan. In early 1407 Balša married Mara, a daughter of Niketa Thopia who had good relations with the Republic of Venice and since then became a mediator during the war. In 1407 representatives of the Venetian Republic and Balša III met on the territory in possession of Ratac in an attempt to negotiate peace. During negotiations held in June 1408, the Venetians insisted to keep Ratac in their possession. Still, peace negotiations were not successful.

Peace treaty of 1409 

In 1409 Jelena decided to go to Venice to personally negotiate a peace. At the end of May she arrived in Dubrovnik but had to wait for almost two months because her hosts warned her on the presence of the Neapolitan galleys in Adriatic Sea. While she was waiting in Dubrovnik on 9 July 1409 Venice purchased the Dalmatian coast from Ladislaus of Naples for 100,000 ducats. This made Jelena's negotiating position very difficult. At the end of July she finally arrived in Venice. Because of the long voyage she was financially broken so the Venetians had to support her with three ducats a day during negotiations which lasted for three months. On 26 October 1409 a year-long peace agreement was signed without territorial changes for any of the parties. Jelena traveled back to Zeta through Dubrovnik where she received 100 ducats worth of presents. Although both her and Michele Steno, a Doge of Venice, swore on the Gospel to respect the peace agreement, there was no peace in reality.

Continuation of the war 
Venetians directly broke the peace agreement they signed with Jelena when they refused to pay agreed provisions to Balša who in return attacked their possessions in early 1410. His fleet captured the whole Skadar Lake and forced Venetian fustas to retreat. In mid 1410 there was another rebellion in Scutari. After this rebellion Balša III besieged Scutari and plundered its surrounding.

When Niketa Thopia was defeated and captured by Teodor II Muzaka at the end of 1411 Balša divorced Mara because her imprisoned father was of no use to him anymore. At the end of 1412 or beginning of 1413 he married Bolja Zaharia, a daughter of Koja Zaharia who already married his other daughter to one of Đuraševići. Members of Đurašević family held the most distincted positions on the court of Balša III. To bring Koja even more close Balša appointed him as castellan of Budva.

Aftermath 
Both parties were unsatisfied with the peace treaty and believed that the other party was in breach of the agreed terms and that the other party should pay more for the damage during the war. It seems that Venice continued to jeopardize the rights of the Orthodox Church in the region of Skadar Lake. In such circumstances even a small conflict like a minor dispute between Hoti and Mataguži (two clans who lived north of the Skadar Lake, on the border of Zeta and Venetian Scutari) over pasture lands started chain of events which led to the new war. Although Balša III judged in favour of the Mataguži clan, Hoti attacked them and captured the disputed lands. Mataguži killed four Hoti clansmen during the counter-attack. Hoti complained to Balša, who rejected their complaints with the words "You've got what you deserve!". Two of disappointed Hoti's chieftains who led a minor part of the clan decided to leave Balša and requested to be accepted under the Venetian suzerainty. At first Balša himself advised the Venetian governor in Scutari to accept them because he wanted to divide them from the rest of Hoti tribesmen. When he became aware of their eventual influence on the rest of Hoti tribesmen who remained loyal to him he changed his mind and insisted that Paolo Quirin should reject their request. In November 1414 the Senate instructed Paolo Quirin to ignore Balša′s advice and to grant Venetian citizenship to Hoti renegades. In response Balša purchased weapons for his forces which in early spring 1415 attacked and burned village Kalderon near Scutari. Based on Senate's instructions Venetians bribed the leader of the major group of Hoti (Andrija Hot) to accept Venetian suzerainty. By accepting Balša's refugees, Venetians violated their previous agreements with Balša who then decided not to respect their agreements anymore. He began to collect taxes on Venetian goods, confiscate Venetian grain, rob Venetian ships on Bojana and to prepare a military campaign against Hoti who organized a preventive attack against him at the beginning of 1418. In October 1418 Venetians started to confiscate goods owned by merchants from Ulcinj to compensate Venetians traders. In autumn 1418 Balša decided to start a new war. He employed a Venetian garrison of about 50 mercenaries who guarded the Scutari fortress before they switched sides and went to Balša. Balša also arrested all Venetian citizens who were caught on the territory of Zeta. In March 1419 he started a new war—the Second Scutari War.

Notes

Sources 

 

 

 

Wars involving the Republic of Venice
Wars involving Montenegro
History of Shkodër
Venetian period in the history of Montenegro
Venetian period in the history of Albania
1405 in Europe
1413 in Europe
1400s conflicts
1410s conflicts